Coatesville is a city in Chester County, Pennsylvania, United States. The population was 13,350 at the 2020 census. Coatesville is approximately 39 miles west of Philadelphia. It developed along the Philadelphia and Lancaster Turnpike beginning in the late 18th century. It spans U.S. Route 30, the "Main Line" highway that runs west of Philadelphia.

Coatesville developed in the early 20th century with the growth of the Lukens Steel Company and other industry. Its population declined after industrial restructuring, which reduced these jobs. Lukens was bought by the Bethlehem Steel Corporation in 1997. In 2002, Bethlehem was bought by the then Ohio-based International Steel Group (ISG). Later, Mittal Steel bought ISG and merged with Arcelor Steel to form the ArcelorMittal company. In 2020, Cleveland-Cliffs acquired the United States operations of ArcelorMittal.

History

Beginnings
Varying cultures of Native Americans lived in this area. The first known settlement in the area which would be known as Coatesville was a historic Lenape village built along the West Branch of the Brandywine River. This settlement was a post for fur trading with the earliest American settlers. The Brandywine River has featured prominently in the history of Coatesville.

William Fleming, originally from Scotland, is one of the earliest landowners on record.

Moses Coates, a prosperous farmer and the namesake of Coatesville, bought the cabin from Fleming's son in 1787. With the economy rising in the years after the United States gained independence, Moses Coates' son-in-law, Jesse Kersey, came up with a plan to develop the area by selling frontage on the recently completed Lancaster Turnpike which crossed through their land. The Lancaster Turnpike was the first toll road in the U.S., authorized in 1792 and completed in 1795. A tollgate was located within the present-day Coatesville city limits. Because Coatesville was located roughly halfway between Philadelphia and Lancaster on the turnpike, it became a popular stopping place.

Pierre Bizallion, a French fur trader, settled in the area in the early 18th century. He was said to serve as an interpreter between William Penn and Native American peoples.

19th century
Before Coatesville became a city, the only one in Chester County, it was called Bridge-Town, after the two bridges crossing the Brandywine River.  A village named "Midway", named after its station owned by the Philadelphia and Columbia Railroad midway between Philadelphia and Lancaster, was formed in 1834 on the western bank of the Brandywine. The village of Midway and the village of Bridge-Town merged in 1867 to become the borough of Coatesville. Coatesville citizens voted to become a city in 1915.

Coatesville exploited the natural energy of the Brandywine River. They formed the Brandywine Iron Works and Nail Factory, the forerunner of Lukens Steel. Charles Lukens, MD, married Isaac Pennock's daughter Rebecca in 1813. Following her husband's death in 1825, Rebecca Lukens took over the operations of the mill, purchasing it from her mother. She directed operations through a period of turmoil and market panic, developing it into a prosperous mill. Rebecca Lukens was one of the first women to operate a major corporation in the United States.

20th century

As Lukens Steel grew so did Coatesville, eventually becoming known as the "Pittsburgh of the East."  By the beginning of the 20th century the population had grown to 6,000, attracting immigrants from Eastern and Southern Europe to its industrial jobs, as well as both black and white migrants from the rural South. Tensions rose in the city as the population rapidly became more diverse.

In August 1911, steelworker Zachariah Walker was lynched in Coatesville; he had left his wife and children in Virginia while seeking better work. This African-American man was accused of killing Deputy Constable/Coal and Iron Policeman Edgar Rice, a popular figure in town. Walker claimed self-defense and was hospitalized after his arrest. He was dragged from the hospital and burned to death in front of a mob of hundreds in a field south of the city. Fifteen men and teenage boys were indicted, but all were acquitted at trials. The lynching was the last in Pennsylvania and is said to have left a permanent stain on the city's image.

Walker's murder was investigated by the National Association for the Advancement of Colored People (NAACP), which called for an end to lynching nationwide. Pennsylvania passed a state anti-lynching law in 1923. But, even after passage of an anti-lynching House bill in the 1920s, no federal law was passed because of the power of the Democratic southern block in the Senate. At that time it represented only white southerners; African Americans had been disfranchised in the South since the turn of the century.
 
Racial violence was spreading all across America during the Red Summer of 1919 and the local African-American community was on edge. On July 8, 1919, the black community of Coatesville formed a large armed protection group to prevent the rumoured lynching of a rape suspect. When the armed group surrounded the jail to prevent the attack they learned that there was no suspect and no lynch mob.

In 1929, the Coatesville VA Medical Center was built with an original mission to provide neuropsychiatric care to veterans. In 2013, the Medical Center, with its distinctive architecture of Colonial Revival and Classical Revival, was listed on the National Register of Historic Places. The Medical Center now provides a range of health care services to more than 19,000 Veterans in Pennsylvania and Delaware. 

The school system expanded to keep up and the religious community became more diverse, with Roman Catholic churches founded and Beth Israel Congregation, one of Chester County's few synagogues. In 1932 there were a total of 22 churches of various denominations in the city. 

After World War II the steel industry began a long decline, but in the 1960s Lukens Steel was still the largest employer in Chester County, with over 10,000 workers. It finally started to restructure due to industry changes, was sold several times, and its workers were reduced in number to 5,000 and eventually to 2,000.

21st century

Since the turn of the century, Coatesville has invested in redevelopment, encouraging private projects. It has torn down public housing and encouraged new single family and townhouse developments. A new Marriott Courtyard hotel, built along Route 82 on the outskirts of Coatesville, opened in May 2012. 

The redevelopment plans have generated controversy. The city was involved in a 5-year eminent domain dispute with a local landowner in neighboring Valley Township. It was resolved without the need to seize the property, but displeasure with the events resulted in the city voters turning out four incumbent city councilpersons in the November 2005 general elections. Two of the four new councilpersons are ordained Pentecostal and Methodist ministers, respectively. The city council fired the city solicitor, and accepted the resignation of the city manager (who had negotiated with the Valley Township landowner). The assistant manager, police chief, and city treasurer also resigned.

A series of arsons took place in the city from 2007 to early 2009. A December 2008 fire at a Strode Avenue home resulted in the death of Irene Kempest, an 83-year-old World War II Holocaust survivor. A  fire the following month on the 300 block of Fleetwood Street burned 17 row houses, causing $2 million in damage and leaving dozens of people homeless.
By March 2009, police had arrested six suspects in the fires. A total of nearly 70 fires occurred during this period. On June 8, 2010 one man, pleading no-contest due to mental illness, was sentenced to a 60-year prison sentence for five of the fires, one of which resulted in Kempest's death. Another man pleaded guilty to the Fleetwood Street fire and eight others, receiving a sentence of 12.5 to 25 years with an order to pay $2.5 million in restitution. Twenty of the nearly 70 fires over the two-year span remain unsolved.

In 1969, Lukens Steel forged steel beams for the World Trade Center during its construction in New York City. Some of these trident beams, known as "trees", remained standing after the 9/11 Terrorist Attacks. Ten of the "trees" that remained were transported to Coatesville on April 15, 2010. They are to be used as a part of the proposed National Iron and Steel Heritage Museum.

Twenty-one sites including the Coatesville Historic District, Clement Atkinson Memorial Hospital, High Bridge, Abram Huston House and Carriage House, Lukens Historic District, Lukens Main Office Building, National Bank of Coatesville Building, Terracina, Carver Court, and Coatesville Veterans Affairs Medical Center are resources listed on the National Register of Historic Places.

Geography

Climate
Coatesville has a typical Northeast climate with cold, snowy winters and hot humid summers. It has a hot-summer humid continental climate (Dfa) and the hardiness zone is 6b bordering 7a.

Demographics

The 2010 United States Census stated there were 13,100 people, 4,498 households, and 2,889 families residing in the city, with a population density of 6,894.7 people per square mile (2,673.5/km). The racial makeup of the city was 38.0% White, 46.4% African American, 0.5% Native American, 0.8% Asian, 0.1% Pacific Islander, 8.9% from other races, and 5.3% from two or more races. Hispanic or Latino people of any race were 23.0% of the population.

There were 4,498 households, out of which 36.5% had children under the age of 18 living with them, 28.3% were married couples living together, 27.7% had a female householder with no spouse present, 8.2% had a male householder with no spouse present, and 35.8% were non-families. 42.4% of all households had individuals under 18 living in them, and 19.5% had someone living alone who was 65 years of age or older. The average household size was 2.86 and the average family size was 3.46.

In the city, the population was spread out, with 30.4% under the age of 18. The median age was 31 years. The population was 50.6% female and 49.4% male.

Coatesville had 4,998 housing units, of which 90.2% were occupied. Of the occupied housing units, 37.5% were owner-occupied.

In 2000, the median income for a household in the city was $29,912, and the median income for a family was $36,375. Males had a median income of $31,782 versus $24,774 for females. The per capita income for the city was $14,079. About 18.3% of families and 22.1% of the population were below the poverty line, including 28.9% of those under age 18 and 15.9% of those age 65 or over.

According to the 2017 American Community Survey,  the racial makeup was 25.9% non-Hispanic White, 46.2% African American, 24.5% Hispanic or Latino, and 4.8% two or more races.

Government
The city is a third class city and is governed by a Council–manager form of government. There are seven council members, one for each of the five voting wards and two elected at-large.

Council Members 
:

Transportation

The main east–west road serving Coatesville is US 30, which bypasses the city to the north on a freeway and provides access to Lancaster to the west and Philadelphia to the east. US 30 Business runs east–west through the heart of the city on Lincoln Highway. PA 82 is the main north–south road in Coatesville, running along Strode Avenue, Lincoln Highway, and North 1st Avenue, and heading north to Elverson and south to Kennett Square. PA 340 passes to the north of the city while PA 372 begins at PA 82 in Coatesville and heads west on Valley Road to Parkesburg and Atglen.

The nearest airport with commercial air service is the Philadelphia International Airport in Philadelphia.

Coatesville is served by the Coatesville Amtrak Station, which serves Keystone Service trains along the Keystone Corridor. Until 1997, the station also served SEPTA's R5 regional rail line from Philadelphia, which is now the Paoli/Thorndale Line and ends east of Coatesville in Thorndale. On March 7, 2019, it was announced that SEPTA service would return to Coatesville in the future with a new station to be built near the current Amtrak station that would serve an extension of the Paoli/Thorndale Line service.  On July 13, 2021, the Pennsylvania Department of Transportation announced that it was soliciting bids for the construction of the new station, to be built at Third Avenue and Fleetwood Street, with construction to be completed by 2025. The Reading Company formerly had its own passenger station on the Wilmington and Northern Branch, located at the northwest corner of Lincoln Avenue and 1st Avenue.

Two bus services serve Coatesville. The Coatesville Link, which is operated by Krapf's Transit and managed by the Transportation Management Association of Chester County (TMACC), serves multiple points of interest between Coatesville and Parkesburg. SEPTA Suburban Bus Route 135 connects Coatesville with Downingtown, Exton, and West Chester. In addition, TMACC manages The Outfitter, which provides bus service from Coatesville to the Urban Outfitters distribution center in Gap.

Notable people

 Whittier C. Atkinson, founder of the Clement Atkinson Memorial Hospital
 Vince Belnome, MLB infielder, Tampa Bay Rays
 Walt Downing, NFL center for the San Francisco 49ers (1978–1983)
 John A. Gibney Jr., United States district judge of the United States District Court for the Eastern District of Virginia
 Calvin Grove, professional boxer who won the IBF featherweight title in 1988
 Richard Hamilton, NBA All-Star guard for the Detroit Pistons and the Chicago Bulls
 Ralph Hudson, last person to be put to death by the state of New Jersey
 Billy Joe, 1963 rookie of the year for AFL Denver Broncos; member of the NFL champion New York Jets, 1969
 Ray Keech, auto racing pioneer in the 1920s, won the 1929 Indianapolis 500
 Terrance Laird, NCAA Division I collegiate sprinter
 Rodney Linderman, founding member of punk band The Dead Milkmen, grew up in the Coatesville area
 Rebecca Lukens, owner of Lukens Steel Company, first American female CEO of an industrial company
 Mary Alice Dorrance Malone, billionaire Campbell Soup heiress, lives in Coatesville
 Fred Mascherino, musician and vocalist, Taking Back Sunday, The Color Fred, Terrible Things
 Charles Moore, Olympic champion, 400 m hurdles, Helsinki 1952
 Derrick Morgan, defensive end, Tennessee Titans
 John Grubb Parke, Union general during the American Civil War
 Rod Perry, actor best known for his role as Sgt. David "Deacon" Kay in the 1970s TV series S.W.A.T.
 Susan Richardson, actress, best known for her role as Susan Bradford on the television series Eight Is Enough
 George A. Spratt (1870–1934), inventor and aviation pioneer associated with the Wright brothers
 Zack Steffen, professional soccer player for Manchester City
 Essie Mae Washington-Williams, daughter of Senator Strom Thurmond, grew up in Coatesville
 Johnny Weir, figure skater, Olympian, and TV personality
 John L. Withrow, minister, author

Legacy
In 2006, a Pennsylvania historical marker was placed along PA 82 in East Fallowfield, where Zachariah Walker was lynched.

References

Further reading

External links
 
 

 
Cities in Chester County, Pennsylvania
Cities in Pennsylvania